The 1820 Missouri gubernatorial election was Missouri's first gubernatorial election due to it becoming a state.  In the election, which was held on August 28, 1820, territorial governor William Clark was defeated by Alexander McNair.

References

Missouri
1820
Gubernatorial
August 1820 events